Jesús Ares Otero (born 20 November 1933) is a former Spanish footballer who played as a midfielder.

Career
Ares began his career in the Segunda División with local club Lucense, playing once. In 1952, Ares signed for fellow Galician club Racing Ferrol, where he played for two seasons, making 33 league appearances, scoring twice.

In March 1954, Ares signed for Primera División club Celta Vigo. Ares failed to break into the first team at Celta in his first two full seasons at the club, making just seven appearances, before finding favour under new manager Alejandro Scopelli in the 1956–57 season, making 28 appearances. On 11 November 1956, Ares scored his first goal for Celta in a 3–0 away win against Deportivo La Coruña in the Galician derby. In 1957, Atlético Madrid signed Ares for 1,250,000 Ptas. Ares once again failed to cement a starting spot at Atlético Madrid and moved to Málaga in 1958.

In 1960, Ares signed for Salamanca, spending three seasons at the club, before moving to Langreo, where he retired from football in 1966.

References

1933 births
Living people
Spanish footballers
People from A Mariña Central
Sportspeople from the Province of Lugo
Footballers from Galicia (Spain)
Association football midfielders
Racing de Ferrol footballers
RC Celta de Vigo players
Atlético Madrid footballers
CD Málaga footballers
UD Salamanca players
UP Langreo footballers
La Liga players
Segunda División players